Sarine may refer to:
Sarine District, one of Switzerland's seven districts 
Saane/Sarine, a Swiss river
Sarine Voltage, an American musician 
Sarine, Lebanon (a village)
Sarine Technologies, a company that specializes in diamonds

See also
Sarin (disambiguation)
Serin (disambiguation)